Gillmor may refer to:

People

Arthur Hill Gillmor (1824–1903), Canadian farmer, lumberman and politician
Dan Gillmor, American technology writer
Daniel Gillmor (1849–1918), Canadian merchant and politician
Helen W. Gillmor (born 1942), United States federal judge
Paul Gillmor (1939–2007), American politician
Robert Gillmor (born 1936), English ornithologist, artist, and author
Samuel Gillmor Haughton (1889–1959), British politician

Other
Mount Gillmor, a mountain of Oates Land, the United States

See also
Gilmor
Gilmore (disambiguation)
Gilmore (surname)
Gilmour (disambiguation)
Gilmour (surname)